Daniel Ceballos Fernández (born 7 August 1996) is a Spanish professional footballer who plays as a central or attacking midfielder for La Liga club Real Madrid and the Spain national team.

Ceballos started his career at Spanish club Real Betis where he helped them win the Segunda División. He was signed by Real Madrid in 2017, and two years later signed for English Premier League club Arsenal on loan.

Ceballos won his first cap for Spain in September 2018, in 6–0 home win over Croatia in the UEFA Nations League.

Club career

Real Betis

Ceballos was born in Utrera, Andalusia. He joined Sevilla's youth system in 2004 at the age of eight, but was released in 2009 due to a chronic bronchitis problem. He subsequently played for hometown club Utrera, and completed his development with Real Betis after signing in 2011. He signed a professional contract with Betis on 22 February 2014, while still a junior.

On 26 April 2014, without even appearing for the B team, Ceballos played his first game with the club's main squad, coming on as a late substitute in a 1–0 La Liga home loss against Real Sociedad. He scored his first goal on 21 December, with the first of a 2–0 home win over Racing Santander in the Segunda División championship. He featured in 33 matches and scored 5 times during the 2014–15 Segunda División season, as Betis returned to La Liga at the first attempt.

On 15 October 2015, after lengthy negotiations, Ceballos renewed his contract until June 2020. He scored his first goal in the Spanish top flight on 16 April 2017, with the last goal in a 2–0 home win against Eibar.

Real Madrid
On 14 July 2017, Ceballos signed for La Liga club Real Madrid on a six-year contract, for a transfer fee of around €18 million. He made his debut on 16 August, replacing Toni Kroos on the 80th minute of the second leg of the 2017 Supercopa de España, a 2–0 home victory over Barcelona. On 23 September, in his first start, he scored a two goals in a 2–1 away win over Deportivo Alavés.

Ceballos made four appearances during the 2017–18 UEFA Champions League, as Madrid won their third consecutive and 13th overall title in the tournament. On 13 January 2019, after only 15 minutes on the pitch and having been constantly booed by his former club's supporters, he scored from a free kick in the last minute of a 2–1 victory against Betis at the Estadio Benito Villamarín.

Loan to Arsenal 
On 25 July 2019, Ceballos joined Premier League club Arsenal on a season-long loan. He made his first start for Arsenal on 17 August in a 2–1 victory over Burnley, providing two assists in a man-of-the-match performance. On 3 October, Ceballos scored his first goal for Arsenal in a 4–0 home victory against Standard Liège in the group stage of the 2019–20 UEFA Europa League. On 28 June 2020, he scored his second Arsenal goal against Sheffield United in stoppage time to secure a 1–2 win in the quarter-final of the 2019–20 FA Cup. He played the full 90 minutes in the final, in which Arsenal beat Chelsea 2–1 at Wembley Stadium.

On 4 September 2020, Ceballos was loaned to Arsenal for another season. In one of the interviews, he stated that the manager, Mikel Arteta, was the main reason why he decided to stay at Arsenal, and that since joining the club he had become a much more mature player, having improved a lot.

Return to Real Madrid
Ceballos missed several months of the 2021–22 season due to a heavy injury on his left ankle that he suffered in Spain's opening game against Egypt in the 2020 Summer Olympics. His first appearance upon his return came in 5 January 2022 as a substitute in a 3–1 away win over CD Alcoyano in the third round of 2021–22 Copa del Rey. On 28 May 2022, he came on as a substitute for Luka Modrić in the 2022 UEFA Champions League final, which saw Madrid achieve a 1–0 win over Liverpool to lift the title.

Ceballos provided an assist and scored the winning goal in a 3–2 comeback victory in the 2022–23 Copa del Rey round of 16 match against Villarreal on 19 January 2023.

International career

On 5 November 2014, Ceballos was called up to the Spain under-19 side, appearing against Germany, France and Greece in a tournament played in the latter nation. He made his debut for the under-21s on 26 March 2015, replacing Samu Castillejo at half-time of a 2–0 friendly win over Norway in Cartagena; four days later, in León, he made his first start, in a 4–0 win over Belarus.

Despite beginning the competition in Poland on the bench, Ceballos' performances at the 2017 UEFA European Under-21 Championship led Spain to the second place. Subsequently, he was named the player of the tournament. With the under-21 side he also took part in the victorious 2019 UEFA European Under-21 Championship Spain team. He was named in the team of the tournament for the second successive tournament.

Ceballos won his first cap for the senior team on 11 September 2018, playing the entire 6–0 home win over Croatia in the 2018–19 UEFA Nations League. He scored his first goal for his country on 15 November, in a 3–2 loss in Zagreb against the same opponent and in the same competition.

On 29 June 2021, Ceballos was included as one of three overaged players in Spain's preliminary squad for the 2020 Summer Olympics after having missed out on Euro 2020 due to injury. In July 2021, he was included in the 22-player squad of the under-23 team for the 2020 Summer Olympics.

Controversies
In 2012, he labelled both Cesc Fàbregas and Gerard Piqué as "shameless", when they celebrated Spain's win at the UEFA Euro 2012 with the Senyera flag, in which he also added: "Get out of the country, Catalans!". In 2015, he wished that a bomb be dropped "on the stands and kill those Catalan and Basque dogs" at Camp Nou during the 2015 Copa del Rey Final between Barcelona and Athletic Bilbao, as their supporters whistled the Spanish national anthem. In addition, he had written a pro-Franco tweet, and derogatory comments about Iker Casillas and his wife Sara Carbonero. On the final matchday in the 2015–16 La Liga season, he told Getafe's player Cala, "I hope you go rot in the Segunda División and the club disappears".

Career statistics

Club

International

Spain score listed first, score column indicates score after each Ceballos goal

Honours
Real Betis
Segunda División: 2014–15

Real Madrid
La Liga: 2021–22
Supercopa de España: 2017, 2021–22
UEFA Champions League: 2017–18, 2021–22
UEFA Super Cup: 2022
FIFA Club World Cup: 2017, 2018, 2022

Arsenal
FA Cup: 2019–20

Spain U19
UEFA European Under-19 Championship: 2015

Spain U21
UEFA European Under-21 Championship: 2019; runner-up: 2017

Spain Olympic
Summer Olympic silver medal: 2020

Individual
UEFA European Under-21 Championship Player of the Tournament: 2017
UEFA European Under-21 Championship Team of the Tournament: 2017

References

External links

Profile at the Real Madrid CF website

1996 births
Living people
People from Utrera
Sportspeople from the Province of Seville
Footballers from Andalusia
Spanish footballers
Association football midfielders
Real Betis players
Betis Deportivo Balompié footballers
Real Madrid CF players
Arsenal F.C. players
La Liga players
Segunda División B players
Segunda División players
Premier League players
FA Cup Final players
Spanish expatriate footballers
Expatriate footballers in England
Spanish expatriate sportspeople in England
Spain youth international footballers
Spain under-21 international footballers
Spain international footballers
Olympic footballers of Spain
Footballers at the 2020 Summer Olympics
Olympic medalists in football
Olympic silver medalists for Spain
Medalists at the 2020 Summer Olympics
UEFA Champions League winning players